Beyond the Gap is a fantasy novel by Harry Turtledove, published in February 2007. It is the first book of the Opening of the World series. The book centers on several citizens of the fictional Iron Age Empire of Raumsdalia, a land whose inhabitants have North Germanic names. Raumsdalia is situated south of a great steppeland which is bordered on the north by a vast, seemingly unending glacier.

Plot summary
When a gap opens in the glacier, Count Hamnet Thyssen and Ulric Skakki are dispatched by Emperor Sighvat II of Raumsdalia to explore the other side. Together with Earl Eyvind Torfin and a wizard, Audun Gilli, they team up with Trasamund, a chieftain of the nomadic, mammoth-herding Bizogot nation. Crossing through the gap, the explorers discover that a powerful tribal confederation, who call themselves "the Rulers," are preparing to burst through the gap and seize the lands to the south for their own.

References

Novels by Harry Turtledove
American fantasy novels
2007 American novels